Pilecki (feminine: Pilecka; plural: Pileccy) is a Polish surname. It may refer to:
 Elizabeth Granowska or Pilecka (c. 1372–1420), Queen consort of Poland
 Daniela Walkowiak-Pilecka (born 1935), Polish sprint canoer
 Joanna Pilecka (born 1976), Polish diplomat
 Stan Pilecki (1947–2017), Australian rugby union player
 Witold Pilecki (1901–1948), Polish cavalry officer, intelligence agent and resistance leader

See also
 
 
 Wólka Pilecka, a village in Poland

Polish-language surnames